Mazire Soula (born 6 June 1998) is a French professional footballer who plays as an attacking midfielder for Bulgarian club Cherno More Varna.

Club career
In 2020, Mazire Soula signed a contract with USM Alger.

References

External links
 

1998 births
Living people
Algerian footballers
USM Alger players
PFC Cherno More Varna players
Association football forwards
21st-century Algerian people